The Stephenson Disaster Management Institute at Louisiana State University is located in the Stephenson National Center for Security Research and Training at LSU.

In February 2007, as a direct result of Hurricane Katrina, LSU alumni Emmet and Toni Stephenson donated $25 million to LSU.  Approximately $11 million was allocated to create the Stephenson Disaster Management Institute, as a result of LSU's unique experience and outstanding performance during hurricane relief efforts.  The institute enhances LSU's ability to focus its existing programs and research capacity on the particular problems of disasters, while adding additional capacity with respect to strategic management and decision making. The institute works with its LSU research affiliates to collaborate on projects and research proposals that will improve disaster preparedness and response. Research disciplines span across multiple departments, including engineering, psychology, sociology, information systems & decision sciences, veterinary medicine, economics, and computer science. Serving as the interface between researchers and practitioners, the Stephenson Disaster Management Institute supports projects that encourage partnerships between these communities that inform and improve the quality of research and assure that academic findings are translated into solutions business and emergency managers can use in the field.

SDMI Projects

Hazard Mitigation Geospatial Updates 
Over the last two years, SDMI has been working aggressively to complete a project that was awarded to SDMI by the Governor's Office of Homeland Security and Emergency Preparedness to collect spatially-correct data for the State's entire inventory of critical infrastructure. The overall goal of this project is to provide data that will assist the State's Hazard Mitigation section and planners at the state and local levels in refining and enhancing their hazard mitigation and emergency operations plans based on accurate geospatial data as well as enhance situational awareness during real-time emergencies. This project has proven to be very important for the planning efforts in updating the State's local hazard mitigation plans. Information collected from this project is being utilized to vastly improve the data, to develop potential damage assessments for specific hazards, and to identify vulnerable infrastructure throughout the parishes. As part of this contract, SDMI has completed projects related to critical infrastructure, high resolution flight imagery, and school safety programs.

Hazard Mitigation Local Plan Updates 
Local governments are required by law under the Disaster Mitigation Act of 2000 and 44 CFR § 201.6 to maintain a hazard mitigation plan and to update it every five years. Louisiana encourages the development of multi-jurisdictional plans, which encompass parish and municipal governments. Between 2015 and 2017 the majority of Louisiana's 64 parishes are due to update their HMPs. To improve the usability of local HMPs and to enhance the data used for the State's Hazard Mitigation Plan (SHMP), SDMI has been chosen to assist the local jurisdictions in the update process. Based on the 2014 SHMP template, SDMI will standardize the local HMP layout and utilize its GIS expertise to gather the most recent data for the parish-level hazard analyses and risk assessments.

Division of Administration 9-1-1 Mapping and GIS Portal Project 
SDMI is currently in the final year of a 27-month agreement with the Louisiana Division of Administration's Office of Information Technology to serve as the principal investigator to develop geospatial point data for addresses in rural Louisiana parishes.

The Department of Homeland Security Center for Excellence for Maritime Security 
SDMI was invited by the University of Alaska at Anchorage to participate in an application for an existing DHS Center of Excellence on Maritime Security that was being re-competed following its initial five year award. In an unusual move, DHS decided to issue two awards for this center, with the incumbent, The Stevens Institute of Technology, being retained and a second Center being awarded to the University of Alaska to focus exclusively on maritime issues in the Arctic environment. DHS was significantly impressed with SDMI's application and determined that SDMI would be joined as a new member of the center. However, instead of partnering with the University of Alaska, SDMI was paired with the Stevens Institute of Technology. SDMI's knowledge and ability to work with inland ports complements the Stevens Institute of Technology on coastal ports. The center is funded for five years and represents a tremendous growing opportunity for SDMI.

SDMI Initiatives

The Transformational Technology & Cyber Research Center 
SDMI leadership levied a number of independent circumstances and conditions that presented concurrently to wager the creation of the new Transformational Technology & Cyber Research Center (TTCRC). SDMI saw these conditions as an opportunity toward accomplishing its primary objectives and moved to assemble a joint team to create the TTCRC. Specifically, SDMI has opined for more than a year that cyber and other evolving threats present potential for disasters and represent a blurring of effect in that civilian, military, and government targets are more equally threatened by both natural and man-made disaster. SDMI has also long been advocating for LSU to focus more research through an applied research institute such as SDMI as funders are more often demanding a new capability or decision support function they did not have before.

Louisiana National Guard/SDMI Cyber Lab 
In order to enhance security of cyber networks and minimize the risks of Critical Infrastructure/Key Resources (CIKR) Industrial Control Systems (ICS) and private sector networks, SDMI, in partnership with the Louisiana National Guard, is in the process of building a Cyber Lab that will incorporate the Federal cyber framework and programs with local CIKR industry and private sector training. SDMI is creating this virtual lab for CIKR industry and private sector representatives to use as a test and evaluation center for their ICS and internal networks. The goal of this lab is to replicate industry specific and private sector topology and configurations so that they will be able to conduct tests and Incident Response (IR) procedures in a closed environment without affecting and real-world production. These tests and IR procedures will be evaluated against the Federal frameworks and standards to identify gaps and areas for improvement. SDMI will then develop industry tailored training for that organization's cyber response personnel wherein personnel will be able to attend training and earn certifications for compliance with Federal standards of CIKR Cybersecurity.

SDMI Enhanced School Safety Program 
Recognizing the important role that situational awareness and pre-planning has in responding to School Safety, at the request of the Jefferson Parish School Board, SDMI has developed an enhanced school safety-planning program. As part of an existing contract with GOHSEP, SDMI has been collecting and publishing school floor plans in a secure web based program. The digital floor plans allow first responders to access the schools plans in the event that they are needed to help respond to an active shooter or other emergency that a school may experience. While recognizing the advantage of such a program, Jefferson Parish sought to develop a process in which more information than just floor plans could be obtained.

Animal in Disaster Advisory Group 
The ADAG brings together subject matter experts in the field of animal welfare to improve animal disaster preparation, response and recovery. The strong partnership between SDMI and LDAF who has been a national leader in this area having responded to numerous state emergencies both natural and man-made has been mutually beneficial. LDAF has worked with the LSU Vet School and the Louisiana State Animal Response Team (LSART) and numerous other organizations involved in disaster animal response. They are also represented on the National Alliance of State Animal and Agricultural Emergency Programs board. SDMI, LDAF and our other ADAG members will continue to coordinate these efforts to improve planning, increase resources, develop best practices and willingly share this information with all those interested in animal welfare.

In its first year, the SDMI Animals in Disaster Advisory Group (ADAG) has accomplished two major projects including the development of a Guide focused on "Best Practices for Pet Evacuation and Sheltering" which has been endorsed by FEMA and the creation of a Mobile Pet Animal Shelter that can shelter up to 50 animals and be deployed anywhere in the country through the Emergency Management Assistance Compact (EMAC). The guide and the mobile shelter are the first of several projects that the ADAG has worked on that will make a positive impact in animal rescue and sheltering.

International Disaster Conference and Expo (IDCE) 
SDMI and its partners involved in the National Evacuation Conference (NEC) have established a partnership in support of the annual IDCE. The 4-day conference held in New Orleans features nationally and internationally recognized and distinguished leaders presenting information, which informs, educates, and shapes the policies and procedures governing the manner in which the world addresses both man-made and natural disasters. In 2014, IDCE had just over 1,400 registered participants representing 31 countries and 46 states with 256 exhibitors in 98 booths. Emergency Management and Homeland Security Officials, International, Federal, State, and Municipal Government leadership, Military, First Responders, Academia, and various private sector, industry and association leaders attended.

Center for Business Preparedness (CBP) 
The CBP is currently involved in several projects involving business continuity and resilience. One project was the conduct of the "Business Preparedness Survey" for the purpose of gaining valuable information on how local, state, and Federal emergency management agencies could best support the private sector in preparing for, responding to, and recovering from all-hazard emergencies. The results of the survey were shared with the emergency management community, and various participating business associations at the Louisiana Emergency Preparedness Association (LEPA) annual conference and at the National Emergency Management Association (NEMA) meeting.

Corporate Membership 
SDMI Center for Business Preparedness (CBP) continues to conduct outreach to the private sector to form relationships that are mutually beneficial and long term and whose passions are aligned with SDMI. Through the Corporate Membership Program SDMI has been able to attract companies at various support levels that are interested in supporting the SDMI mission. SDMI broadened the levels of the program this past year to enable smaller business to participate. Starting memberships at $500 attracted a number of businesses that would not have been interested in supporting SDMI. SDMI is committed to supporting a mutual beneficial relationship. The benefits of membership include information sharing, research, and the opportunity to partner on on-going and future SDMI projects. Corporate members include Waguespack Insurance Agency, SecureNation, Shell Pipeline, Cox Communications, DRC, Witt I. O'Brien's, Entergy, and IXIA.

Board of experts
 Emmet Stephenson
 Toni Stephenson
 Lori Bertman, President and CEO The Irene W. and C.B. Pennington Foundation
 Reverend Jerry D. Campbell, President Claremont School of Theology
 Mark Cooper, Director of Emergency Management Walmart
 Kevin Davis, Director Louisiana Governor's Office of Homeland Security and Emergency Preparedness
 James Fernandez, Executive Director Stephenson National Center for Security Research and Training
 Russel L. Honore, Lieutenant General U.S. Army (ret.)
 Dick White, PhD, Dean E.J. Ourso College of Business
 Thomas O. Ryder, Former Chairman and CEO The Reader's Digest Association
 Michael G. Strain, Commissioner Agriculture and Forestry
 Andy Mitchell, Director Technical Hazards Division, FEMA

References

External links 
 Stephenson Disaster Management Institute

Louisiana State University
Emergency organizations